This is a List of members of the 17th Lok Sabha (17 June 2019 – 16 June 2024) arranged by state-wise & union territory-wise representation in Lok Sabha. These members of the Lower house of the Indian Parliament were elected in the 2019 Indian general election held in April–May 2019.

Andhra Pradesh

Keys:

Arunachal Pradesh

Keys:

Assam

Keys:

Bihar

Keys:

Chhattisgarh

Keys:

Goa

Keys:

Gujarat

Keys:

Haryana

Keys:

Himachal Pradesh

Keys:

Jharkhand

Keys:

Karnataka

Keys:

Kerala

Keys:

Madhya Pradesh

Keys:

Maharashtra

Keys:
NDA (37)

MVA (10)

Others (1)

Manipur

Keys:

Meghalaya

Keys:

Mizoram

Keys:

Nagaland

Keys:

Odisha

Keys:

Punjab

Keys:

Rajasthan

Keys:

Sikkim

Keys:

Tamil Nadu

Keys:

Telangana

Keys:

Tripura

Keys:

Uttar Pradesh

Keys:

Uttarakhand

Keys:

West Bengal

Keys:

Andaman and Nicobar Islands

Keys:

Chandigarh

Keys:

Dadra and Nagar Haveli and Daman and Diu
Keys:

Jammu and Kashmir
Keys:

Ladakh
Keys:

Lakshadweep
Keys:

NCT of Delhi

Keys:

Puducherry

Keys:

See also
 List of current members of the Rajya Sabha, the Upper House of Parliament of India
 List of constituencies of the Lok Sabha
 Member of parliament, Lok Sabha
 List of members of the 16th Lok Sabha

References

List
Lists of current office-holders in India
17
India